Piorunów may refer to the following places:
Piorunów, Greater Poland Voivodeship (west-central Poland)
Piorunów, Łódź Voivodeship (central Poland)
Piorunów, Masovian Voivodeship (east-central Poland)